Miss Universe United Kingdom 2005 , the 1st Miss Universe United Kingdom pageant, was held at Glasgow Royal Concert Hall, Glasgow, United Kingdom on 29 April 2005. That year only 30 candidates competed for the national crown. The winner represented the United Kingdom at Miss Universe 2005.

Final results

Special Awards

Final Competition Scores

 Winner 
 First runner-up
 Second runner-up 
 Third runner-up
 Fourth runner-up
 Top 10

 Rank in each round of competition

Delegates

Trivia
Brooke Johnston was born in London to Canadian parents and represented Canada in Miss Earth 2003, but not placed. She lives in Montreal, Quebec.
Ambuyah Ebanks went to represent the Cayman Islands in Miss Universe 2006, but not placed.
Lucy Evangelista represented Northern Ireland at Miss World 2005 and placed in the Top 10.

External links
 http://www.missuniversegb.co.uk

2005
2005 beauty pageants
2005 in the United Kingdom
Events in Glasgow
Beauty pageants in Scotland